Sanubar Tursun (Chinese: 塞努拜尔·吐尔逊; pinyin: Sāinǔbài'ěr Tǔ'ěrxùn; b. 1971) is a Uyghur female singer-songwriter, famous dutar player and researcher for Uyghur Muqams. Tursun released her first album in 2000. She was a judge in the Uyghur language The Voice of the Silk Road. She was allegedly sentenced to 5 years in prison.

Early life
Sanubar was born in Ghulja, to musician Tursun Chang. Her father taught her to play stringed instruments including dutar and satar. She trained and worked professionally as a chang (hammer dulcimer) player.

In May 2014, she gave a performance at University of London.

On 7 August 2016, she appeared in Los Angeles.

Disappearance

Her scheduled performances in the French cities of Nantes, Angers and Rennes were cancelled in November 2018 after she encountered difficulties leaving China.

Reports claimed that she was detained by the Chinese authorities in November 2018 and sentenced to 5 years in prison. Her concert in Shanghai in November 2019 was cancelled.

See also
Adil Mijit
Rahile Dawut
Abdurehim Heyt

References

Living people
1971 births
Uyghur music
Uyghurs